God's Great Wilderness is a 1927 American silent northern drama film directed by David Hartford and starring Lillian Rich, Joseph Bennett and Russell Simpson.

It takes place amongst the lumber workers, where a new family arrive and clash with one of the older settlers.

Cast
 Lillian Rich as 	Mary Goodheart
 Joseph Bennett as 	Dick Stoner
 Russell Simpson as 	Richard Stoner
 Mary Carr as Emma Stoner
 John Steppling as Noah Goodheart
 Rose Tapley as Susan Goodheart
 Edward Coxen as Paul Goodheart
 Tom Bates as Peter Marks
 Wilbur Higby as Ward Maxwell
 Roy Laidlaw as Circuit Rider

References

Bibliography
 Connelly, Robert B. The Silents: Silent Feature Films, 1910-36, Volume 40, Issue 2. December Press, 1998.
 Munden, Kenneth White. The American Film Institute Catalog of Motion Pictures Produced in the United States, Part 1. University of California Press, 1997.

External links
 

1927 films
1927 drama films
1920s English-language films
American silent feature films
Silent American drama films
Films directed by David Hartford
American black-and-white films
1920s American films